New Shabbos Waltz is an album by American musicians David Grisman and Andy Statman, released in 2006. It is a follow-up to their 1995 album Songs of Our Fathers and is a tribute to Grisman's and Statman's Jewish heritage. The album contains instrumental recordings from traditional Jewish repertoire, old and new.

Track listing 

 "Avinnu Malkeinu"
 "Anim Zemiros"
 "Pischu Li"
 "Shabbos HaYom LaShem"
 "Mim'komkha"
 "New Shabbos Waltz"
 "Ya'aleh"
 "Oifen Pripitchik"
 "Old Klezmer"
 "Yerusalayim Irkhah"
 "Yerusalayim Shel Zahav"
 "Lekha Dodi"
 "Ani Ma'amin"

Personnel 
 David Grisman – mandolin, octave banjo-mandolin, banjoguitar
 Andy Statman – clarinet, mandolin
 Hal Blaine – drums
 Edgar Meyer – bass
 Zachariah Spellman – tuba
 Enrique Coria – guitar
 Bob Brozman – guitar
 Samson Grisman – bass

References 

2006 albums
David Grisman albums
Andy Statman albums
Collaborative albums
Jewish music albums